Goltsovo is a rural locality (a village) in Ust-Alexeyevskoye Rural Settlement, Velikoustyugsky District, Vologda Oblast, Russia. The population was 4 as of 2002.

Geography 
Goltsovo is located 58 km southeast of Veliky Ustyug (the district's administrative centre) by road. Olkhovka is the nearest rural locality.

References 

Rural localities in Velikoustyugsky District